K-360 is a state highway in Cowley County, Kansas, United States. It follows a route around the south and east sides of Winfield. The highway was established in 1997. (Although the route begins and ends in Winfield, it passes several times in and out of the city limits.)

Route description
K-360 starts at an intersection with U.S. Route 77 in southern Winfield. After the intersection with Wheat Road the highway curves gently due east and then due north around the southeast side of Winfield, then continues north along the east side of Winfield a further  to its terminus with U.S. Route 160.

K-360 is not a part of the United States National Highway System. The highway connects to the National Highway System at its intersection with U.S. Route 77. The western sections of the highway are more traveled than the eastern sections, with an annual average daily traffic of 2235 on the first  of the route, 1703 on the next , and 1179 on the final  of the route. The entirety of K-360's route is paved with Portland cement concrete pavement.

History
K-360 first appeared on the State of Kansas highway maps in 1997. The routing of K-360 has remained unchanged.

Major intersections

See also

 List of state highways in Kansas
 List of highways numbered 360

References

External links

 KDOT State Map
 Kansas Highways Routelog

360
Transportation in Cowley County, Kansas